Dénes Kemény (born 14 June 1954 in Budapest) is a former Hungarian water polo player who was the trainer and president of the Hungary men's national water polo team from 1997 to 2012. During his reign the Hungarian team won at least a medal in 24 of its 29 major tournaments, including three Olympic golds in a row between 2000 and 2008, making him one of the most successful water polo coaches in Olympic history.

Kemény graduated in 1978 as a veterinary doctor. In 1990 he received his degree which made him a water polo trainer, and in 1998 a water polo master trainer. As a player, he was a member of the European Junior Champion team in Duisburg in 1973. Under his leadership the Hungarian national team became one of the most successful teams in the world winning the Olympic Games in 2000, 2004 and 2008, the Water Polo World Championship in 2003, the FINA Water Polo World League in 2003 and 2004, the FINA Water Polo World Cup in 1999, and the Water Polo European Championship in 1997 and 1999.

He was granted the Hungarian Sports President of the Year award five times (1999, 2000, 2003, 2004, 2008).

See also
 Hungary men's Olympic water polo team records and statistics
 List of Olympic champions in men's water polo
 List of world champions in men's water polo
 List of members of the International Swimming Hall of Fame

References

External links
 
  Profile

1954 births
Living people
Water polo players from Budapest
Hungarian male water polo players
Hungarian water polo coaches
Hungary men's national water polo team coaches
Water polo coaches at the 2000 Summer Olympics
Water polo coaches at the 2004 Summer Olympics
Water polo coaches at the 2008 Summer Olympics
Water polo coaches at the 2012 Summer Olympics
Hungarian veterinarians
20th-century Hungarian people
21st-century Hungarian people